Samberg  is a surname. Notable people with the surname include:

Andy Samberg (born 1978), American actor, filmmaker, musician, and comedian
Arthur J. Samberg (1941–2020), American businessman
Avishag Samberg (born 2001), Israeli taekwondo Olympic bronze medalist
Dylan Samberg (born 1999), American ice hockey player